Senator Brayton may refer to:

George Brayton (New York politician) (1772–1837), New York State Senate
Isaac Brayton (1801–1885), Ohio State Senate